Uskumruköy (literally mackerel village) is a village in Sarıyer intracity district of İstanbul Province, Turkey. The population of Uskumruköy is 4524  as of 2010. 
The village is an old village and the ruins of an observation tower around the village was probably built by Republic of Genoa in the Middle Ages. During Ottoman Empire era the village was a gathering place of the army prior to campaigns to west. The economy of the village used to depend on cattle breeding and woodchopping. But at the present, most of the village area was bought by the construction companies and modern houses for İstanbul residents are being built. According to muhtar there are about 2500 villas in the village area. On the other hand, new European quarters of İstanbul are planned to be built in a vast area which covers Uskumruköy.

References

Villages in Istanbul Province
Sarıyer